Ilsur Gumerovich Samigullin (born 6 February 1991) is a Russian former football midfielder.

Career
Samigullin made his professional debut for FC Rubin Kazan on 15 July 2009 in the Russian Cup game against FC Volga Tver.

In July 2015, Samigullin moved on loan to Kazakhstan Premier League side FC Zhetysu.

References

External links
 

1991 births
People from Nizhnekamsk
Living people
Russian footballers
Russia youth international footballers
FC Rubin Kazan players
Kazakhstan Premier League players
FC Zhetysu players
Russian expatriate footballers
Expatriate footballers in Kazakhstan
Association football midfielders
FC Neftekhimik Nizhnekamsk players
FC Zenit-Izhevsk players
Tajikistan Higher League players
Sportspeople from Tatarstan